Delia Magaña (February 2, 1903 – March 31, 1996) was a Mexican film and television actress, singer, and dancer.

Life
Although she started as a silent film actress, Magaña became best known for her comic supporting roles in her later years. For her 60 years in the film industry, as well as for contributing to the American cinema, Magaña's name and handprint are preserved in the sidewalk outside Mann's Chinese Theater in Hollywood, California.

Films
She made 14 films in the United States and around 240 in her native Mexico. Magaña's first movies were silent films. She later appeared with such film stars as Pedro Infante and Mario Moreno, who went by the screen name of Cantinfias.

Fox Film producer Robert J. Flaherty spotted Magana at the age of twenty. He was in Mexico City working on a motion picture. Among her numerous movies are El Hombre malo (1930), Cascarrabias (1930), Besame mucho (1945), Immaculada (1950), La Nina Popoff (1952), Los chiflados del rock and roll (1957), Satánico pandemonium (1975), Esa mi Raza (1977), and Lagunilla 2 (1983). Her last appearance in films was ¿Y tú... quién eres? (1990).

Miss Magaña was once a guest of honor of a fiesta and dance presented by the United Spanish Speaking Societies. It was held in the Leamington Hotel, San Francisco, on October 27, 1946.

Death
Delia Magaña died of pneumonia in Mexico City on March 31, 1996. She had been admitted sixteen days earlier. She was cremated. Survivors included a niece, Concepción de Teja Magaña.

Selected filmography

 Thus is Life (1930)
 The Lieutenant Nun (1944)
 The Disobedient Son (1945)
 The Tiger of Jalisco (1947)
 Corner Stop (1948)
 Immaculate (1950)
 The Price of Living (1954)

References
Daily Northwestern, Hails From Mexico, Friday Evening, March 8, 1929, Page 23.
Intelligencer Record,  Delia Magana, Mexican Actress, Monday, April 1, 1996, Page A-5.
Los Angeles Times, Wave Of Popularity Sweeping Mexican Stars To Top Goes Marching On, January 27, 1929, Page C11.
Oakland Tribune, Spanish Groups in Fiesta Sunday, Thursday, October 24, 1946, Page 21.
Syracuse Record, Tuesday Evening, November 6, 1928, Page 9.

External links

1903 births
1996 deaths
Mexican stage actresses
Mexican female dancers
Mexican film actresses
Mexican silent film actresses
Mexican vedettes
Golden Age of Mexican cinema
20th-century Mexican women singers
Deaths from pneumonia in Mexico